The Maoist Communist Party of Turkey  ( abbreviated as MKP) is a Marxist–Leninist–Maoist insurgent organization in Turkey. It is the most significant of the Maoist organisations in Turkey; it upholds the legacy of Ibrahim Kaypakkaya. It maintains two armed wings: the People's Partisan Forces (Turkish: Partizan Halk Güçleri or PHG) and People's Liberation Army (Turkish: Halk Kurtuluş Ordusu or HKO).
MKP was a part of Revolutionary Internationalist Movement and participated in the Conference of Communist and Workers’ Parties of the Balkans.

History
MKP emerged in 1987 as TKP/ML - Eastern Anatolia Regional Committee  (Doğu Anadolu Bölge Komitesi in Turkish, abbreviated as DABK) and broke away from the declining TKP/ML organisation. In 1993 it reunified with TKP/ML, but this proved unsuccessful; it broke away again in 1994 to become the Communist Party of Turkey (Marxist–Leninist) [abbreviated as TKP(ML) - not to be confused with TKP/ML]. After an increasing ideological divide between the TKP/ML and the Revolutionary Internationalist Movement, the Committee of RIM (CoRIM) eventually ejected the ideologically stagnant TKP/ML. In 2003 TKP (ML) morphed into the Maoist Communist Party (MKP). MKP became a member of RIM and over the years gained influence becoming the most significant Maoist organisation in Turkey. MKP is determined to carry out a "People's War" in Turkey with its armed wing the People's Liberation Army. In 2013 the Party's 3rd congress established the People's Partisan Forces as a second armed wing.

Organisation

The party has two armed wings: in rural areas Peoples' Liberation Army (Halk Kurtuluş Ordusu in Turkish, abbreviated as HKO) and in cities People's Partisan Forces (Partizan Halk Güçleri in Turkish, abbreviated as PHG).

Maoist Youth Union is the youth organization of MKP.

Maoist Women's Union - is women's organization of MKP.

The party has two periodicals titled Devrimci Demokrasi (Revolutionary Democracy) and Sınıf Teorisi (Theory of the Class).

Federation of Democratic Rights ( abbreviated as DHF) - is independent mass organization related to MKP.

Recent activity
In March 2009, Tamer Bilici, a doctor in service during a 2000 hunger strike in Kandıra F-type prison, was punished by MKP-HKO for being a public enemy because he was blamed for deaths and permanent disabilities of inmates. In September 2009 MKP-HKO claimed responsibility for the death of a retired colonel, Aytekin İçmez. In June 2015, MKP-PHG killed former colonel Fehmi Altinbilek.

Designation as a terrorist organisation
The organisation is listed among the 12 active terrorist organisations in Turkey as of 2007 according to Counter-Terrorism and Operations Department of Directorate General for Security (Turkish police).

Human resources
A study carried out by the Counter-Terrorism and Operations Department of Directorate General for Security over a sample of files about people convicted of being terrorists under Turkish laws including 826 militants from the organisation and the three other currently active left-wing organisations (see reference 1) 65% of the members are aged 14 to 25, 16,8% 25 to 30 and 17,5% are older than 30.  University graduates make up 20,4% of the members, high school graduates 33,5%, secondary school graduates 14%, primary school graduates 29,9% and illiterates 1,9% (while they have no sampled literate non-graduate members).

See also
 Maoist insurgency in Turkey

References

External links

Halkin Gunlugu - news portal related to MKP
First Congress of the Maoist Communist Party of Turkey, Revolutionary Worker #1187
History of the Communist Movement in Turkey People's March

1994 establishments in Turkey
2002 establishments in Turkey
Anti-imperialist organizations
Banned communist parties
Banned political parties in Turkey
Communist militant groups
Communist parties in Turkey
Far-left politics in Turkey
Kurdish organisations
Left-wing militant groups in Turkey
Maoist parties
Maoist organizations in Turkey
Organizations designated as terrorist by Turkey
Peoples' United Revolutionary Movement
Political parties established in 1994
Political parties established in 2002
Revolutionary Internationalist Movement